On 31 December 1983, three bombs went off in France, two on a high speed TGV train and another at the Gare de Marseille-Saint-Charles. The bombs killed five people.

The TGV train was in service with passengers, bound for Paris. The explosions happened when the train was travelling south of Lyon. Three passengers were killed and about 30 were wounded by the blast. The train suffered extensive damage with the number 3 passenger car being blown in half and pieces of the trains were found on rooftops of buildings hundreds of meters away. It was estimated that the bomb contained 16kg of explosives. About 15 minutes later a bomb planted in the luggage room of Marseille's terminus train station detonated. Two people were killed at the station.

Carlos the Jackal was convicted for this terrorist attack as well as two in 1982 (the Capitole train bombing and the April Paris car bomb) in December 2011.

See also
 List of terrorist incidents in France

References

1983 murders in France
20th century in Marseille 
20th-century mass murder in France
Attacks on buildings and structures in Marseille
Attacks on railway stations in Europe
Crime in Auvergne-Rhône-Alpes
December 1983 crimes
December 1983 events in Europe
Improvised explosive device bombings in 1983
Improvised explosive device bombings in France
Mass murder in 1983
Murder in Marseille
Terrorist incidents in France in 1983
Terrorist incidents in Marseille
Train bombings in Europe
Building bombings in France
Railway accidents and incidents in France